WhoMadeWho is a Copenhagen-based experimental pop trio, who formed in 2003. The band consists of jazz guitarist Jeppe Kjellberg, drummer Tomas Barfod and singer/bassist Tomas Høffding.

Career
The band released several 12-inches on German disco label Gomma Records including Out the Door and Space to Rent, culminating in their self-titled debut album WhoMadeWho in 2005. In 2009 they released their second album The Plot, the third album Knee Deep was released in 2011 followed by Brighter in 2012. The next album Dreams was released in 2014, and the latest Through The Walls in 2018.

As a live band, WhoMadeWho has played alongside genre-bending contemporaries Daft Punk, Soulwax, Hot Chip, Justice and LCD Soundsystem. After touring together Hot Chip asked to remix their single "TV Friend", and Josh Homme of Queens of the Stone Age has covered "Space for Rent".

WhoMadeWho gained further popularity when they headlined the Benicàssim festival in 2007 after a delay caused scheduled headliners, Klaxons, to arrive too late to play their set.

On 21 February 2014, they played with Arisa the song "Cuccurucucu", a tribute to Franco Battiato, at Festival of Sanremo 2014, Italy.

On 22 February 2021, they played live for the cameras of Cercle at the ancient temples of Abu Simbel in Egypt.

In September 2022 they presented their album 'UUUU' which was inspired by 90s and 00s Electronica and 80s Post-Disco. Album launch took place in London club venue Koko supported by Jan Blomqvist and Rockin Moroccin.

Discography
Studio albums

Other releases
2004: Happy Girl 12" 
2004: Two Covers For Your Party 12" 
2005: The Loop 12"
2005: Space for Rent (Dirt Crew Remix) 12" 
2005: Space for Rent (The Rapture Remix) 12" 
2006: Out the Door (Superdiscount Remix) 12" 
2006: Out the Door (In Flagranti Remix) 12" 
2006: Green Version CD 
2008: TV Friend 12" 
2009: The Plot / The Train 7"
2009: The Plot Remixes Part 1 12"
2009: The Plot Remixes Part 2 12" 
2009: Keep Me in My Plane Remixes 12"
2009: Keep Me in My Plane Remixes 2 12"
2009: The Remix Collection – digital compilation
2021: Live at Abu Simbel - For Cercle

Remixed by
Detone "Inside World"
Digitalism "Inside World"
Daniel Maloso "Inside World"
Lützenkirchen "The Plot"
The Mole "The Plot"
Discodeine "The Plot"
Hot Chip - "TV Friend"
Tomski & Fredboy "TV Friend"
DJ Koze - "Keep Me In My Plane"
The Rapture  "Space For Rent"
Dirt Crew "Space For Rent"
Superdiscount "Out The Door"
In Flangranti  "Out The Door"
Noze - "The Plot"
Tale Of Us - "Every Minute Alone"
Josh Homme - "Space For Rent" (cover version)
Michael Mayer - "Every Minute Alone"
Maceo Plex - "Heads Above"

Remixes of
Hot Chip - "Don´t Dance" (cover version)
Chicks On Speed - "Super Surfer Girl" 
Digitalism  "Idealism"
New Young Pony Club Get Lucky 
Peaches  - "Boys Wanna Be Her"
Mainline: Black Honey 
Munk: Kick Out The Chairs
Namosh: The Pulse 
Tahiti 80: Big Day 
Digitalism: Idealism 
Munk: Live Fast! Die Old!

See also
Filur

References

External links
 Official site

Dance-punk musical groups
Danish musical trios